The Boston Harbor Islands National Recreation Area is a national recreation area situated among the islands of Boston Harbor of Boston, Massachusetts. The area is made up of a collection of islands, together with a former island and a peninsula, many of which are open for public recreation and some of which are very small and best suited for wildlife. The area is run by the Boston Harbor Islands Partnership.  It includes the Boston Harbor Islands State Park, managed by the Commonwealth of Massachusetts. Twenty-one of the 34 islands in the area are also included in the Boston Harbor Islands Archeological District.

Attractions include hiking trails, beaches, the Civil War-era Fort Warren on Georges Island and Boston Light on Little Brewster Island, the oldest lighthouse in the United States. Georges Island and Spectacle Island are served seasonally by ferries to and from Boston, connecting on weekends and summer weekdays with a shuttle boat to several other islands, Hull, and Hingham.

In 1996, there was a project proposal by Boston's mayor Tom Menino and Massachusetts Institute of Technology professor Clifford A. Goudey to revitalize the aquaculture and fish population in Boston Harbor. This would have involved using the old tanks and granite canals on Moon Island.

In 2008, Peddocks Island was used for filming scenes in Martin Scorsese's Shutter Island.

List of islands and peninsulas

The Boston Harbor Islands National Recreation Area is made up of a series of rocky islands and other places on and around Boston Harbor. These include:
 Bumpkin Island (Hingham)
 Button Island (Hingham)
 Calf Island (Boston)
 Deer Island (Boston)
 Gallops Island (Boston)
 Georges Island (Boston)
 Grape Island (Weymouth)
 The Graves (Boston)
 Great Brewster Island (Boston)
 Green Island (Boston)
 Hangman Island (Quincy)
 Langlee Island (Hingham)
 Little Brewster Island (Boston)
 Little Calf Island (Boston)
 Long Island (Boston)
 Lovells Island (Boston)
 Middle Brewster Island (Boston)
 Moon Island (Quincy)
 Nixes Mate (Boston)
 Nut Island (Quincy)
 Outer Brewster Island (Boston)
 Peddocks Island (Hull)
 Raccoon Island (Quincy)
 Ragged Island (Hingham)
 Rainsford Island (Boston)
 Sarah Island (Hingham)
 Shag Rocks (Boston)
 Sheep Island (Weymouth)
 Slate Island (Weymouth)
 Snake Island (Winthrop)
 Spectacle Island (Boston)
 Thompson Island (Boston)
 Webb Memorial Park (Weymouth)
 World's End (Hingham)

Two islands (Castle Island and Spinnaker Island) in Boston Harbor are not part of the National Recreation Area, and other former islands (e.g. Apple Island, Governors Island and Noddle's Island) were obliterated by the formation of East Boston and the expansion of Logan International Airport before the area was designated.

Management
The Boston Harbor Islands National Recreation Area is managed by the Boston Harbor Islands Partnership, a statutory body established as a federal operating committee by the park enabling legislation. The partnership consists of individual members who represent a range of federal, state, city, and nonprofit agencies, including:

 United States National Park Service
 United States Coast Guard
 Massachusetts Department of Conservation and Recreation
 Massachusetts Port Authority
 Massachusetts Water Resources Authority
 City of Boston
 Boston Redevelopment Authority
 Boston Harbor Island Alliance
 Thompson Island Outward Bound Education Center
 The Trustees of Reservations

In addition, the Partnership includes representation from the Boston Harbor Islands Advisory Council, whose  purpose is to make recommendations to the Partnership about park management. There are 13 Partners in total, together with 13 Alternates. Apart from the representative for the Coast Guard, who is appointed by the Secretary of Homeland Security, all the members of the partnership are appointed by the Secretary of the Interior after consultation with the appropriate agency or other body.

In practice, day-to-day management of each individual island or other site is the responsibility of one of the partner agencies or other bodies. The partnership provides a consistency and coordination across the whole park.

Boston Harbor Islands State Park

Boston Harbor Islands State Park is a Massachusetts state park comprising 13 islands located in Boston Harbor, which now forms part of the Boston Harbor Islands National Recreation Area.

The park was developed from the 1970s by the Massachusetts Department of Environmental Management (DEM). In 1996, the Boston Harbor Islands National Recreation Area was created, including the State Park's islands and many others. However, due to the unusual partnership management arrangements of the National Recreation Area, the State Park still exists as a low profile administrative entity. It is now managed by the DEM's successor, the Massachusetts Department of Conservation and Recreation, from a park headquarters near to the ferry terminal in Hingham.

The islands of the Boston Harbor Islands State Park are:
 Bumpkin Island
 Calf Island
 Gallops Island
 Grape Island
 Great Brewster Island
 Green Island
 Hangman Island
 Little Calf Island
 Middle Brewster Island
 Outer Brewster Island
 Raccoon Island
 Sheep Island
 Slate Island

Transportation

Boston Harbor Cruises offers ferry service from Long Wharf at Christopher Columbus Park to Georges and Spectacle Islands.  Free service is available between Georges and Spectacle, as well as between the other islands.  Summer service is also available from Hingham Shipyard and Hull to Georges Island via Grape, Bumpkin, and Lovells Islands.  (These services are separate from MBTA Boat harbor ferries.)

Thompson Island is only open to the public on Sundays during the summer.  It is served by a ferry leaving from both Spectacle Island and the EDIC dock on Terminal Street in South Boston, operated by the Thompson Island Outward Bound Education Center.

Private boats can dock (with various restrictions) at Spectacle, Grape, Bumpkin, Lovells, and Peddocks Islands. The public dock on Georges Island was recently condemned by engineers, although access is still available by making anchor off shore and using a dinghy to row ashore.

Deer Island, Nut Island, Worlds End, and Webb Memorial are accessible by road from the mainland.  Moon Island and Long Island are not open to the public; though Moon Island is accessible by road from Quincy, access is controlled by a police guard station at the beginning of the causeway on the Squantum peninsula. The causeway from Moon Island to Long Island was demolished in 2015 and it is no longer accessible by road.

See also
National Register of Historic Places listings in Plymouth County, Massachusetts
National Register of Historic Places listings in Suffolk County, Massachusetts

References

Bibliography
 Best, Neil A., "Preliminary Design of a Recirculating Aquaculture System in Boston Harbor", Masters Thesis, Ocean Engineering, MIT, February 1997. Technical Advisor, Clifford A. Goudey.
 The Boston Globe, "Harboring recreation", Guest Editorial, June 3, 2006.
 Kales, Emily, Kales, David, "All About the Boston Harbor Islands", Hewitts Cove Publishing, 1983.
 Marcus, John, "Scientists Test Once-Polluted Harbor’s Crop Potential", Los Angeles Times, Sunday, January 11, 1998
 Mikal, Alan, "Exploring Boston Harbor", Christopher Publishing House, North Quincy, Massachusetts, 1973. 
 Northeastern Naturalist, Volume 12, Issue sp3, July 2005. Articles on the Boston Harbor Islands. 
 Richburg, Julie A., Patterson, William A., III, "Historical Description of the Vegetation of the Boston Harbor Islands, 1600-2000", Northeastern Naturalist, v.12, Special Issue 3, 13-30, 2005.
 Sammarco, Anthony Mitchell, "Boston's Harbor Islands", Images of America series, 1998. 
 Sherman, Annie, "The Other Islands: The Harbor Islands make for an easy day trip for sunbathers, history buffs—and especially the traffic-weary", Boston magazine, May 2007 issue.
 Snow, Edward Rowe
 "The Islands of Boston Harbor", 1935.  
 "Sailing Down Boston Bay", Yankee Publishing Company, 1941.
 "Some Events of Boston and Its Neighbors", printed for the State Street Trust Company, Boston, Massachusetts, 1917.
 "The Islands of Boston Harbor", in "Some Events of Boston and Its Neighbors", Chapter 4, printed for the State Street Trust Company, Boston, Massachusetts, 1917.
 Sweetser, M.F., "King's Handbook of Boston Harbor", Moses King Corporation, Boston, 1882; reprinted in 1988 by Applewood Books, and The Friends of Boston Harbor Islands, and in 2010 by BiblioLife.  (2010 reprint). This book was written about the time when the first Boston almshouse was being built on Long Island.

Further reading 

 Metro (Boston edition) newspaper, "Boston Harbor Islands", Boston Neighborhood section, August 1, 2007, p. 14.
 "Harbor islands are jewels, but lack resources and accessibility", Boston Globe, OP/ED, Sunday, April 4, 2010

External links

 Boston Harbor Islands National Recreation Area
 Boston Harbor Islands Visitor Guide
 Boston Harbor resources site
 NOAA Soundings Map of Boston Harbor
 Island Alliance (Boston Harbor)
 Boston Harbor Islands - Massachusetts Department of Conservation & Recreation (DCR).
 The Boston Harbor Association resources
 
Volunteers and Friends of the Boston Harbor Islands Inc. records, 1770-2011, University Archives and Special Collections, Joseph P. Healey Library, University of Massachusetts Boston
 

1996 establishments in Massachusetts
 
 
National Park Service National Recreation Areas
Islands of Massachusetts
Coastal islands of Massachusetts
Boston Harbor
State parks of Massachusetts
National Park Service areas in Massachusetts
Parks in Boston
National Register of Historic Places in Suffolk County, Massachusetts
National Register of Historic Places in Plymouth County, Massachusetts
Protected areas established in 1996